MTV Mandarin is a 24-hour music channel that airs Chinese and international music programs owned by Paramount Networks EMEAA. One of the first three MTV Asia channels along with MTV Asia and MTV India. MTV Mandarin has two different feeds (Taiwan & China). The channel broadcasts in Taiwan, Hong Kong, Singapore, and Indonesia. After 18 years of broadcasting, MTV China and Comedy Central Asia ceased transmission on 1 February 2021. However, MTV Taiwan continues to broadcast.

Operating channels
 MTV Taiwan - based in Taipei, co-owned and operated by Sanlih E-Television since early 2010s.

Shows

Current VJs
 George Chang
 Andy Chen
 Emma
 Stacy Hsu
 Sammy Hu
 Katherine
 Linda Liao
 Meimei
 Tony

See also
 MTV (Music Television)
 MTV Networks Asia Pacific
 MTV Southeast Asia

References

External links
 MTV Taiwan 

Television stations in Taiwan
Television channels and stations established in 1995
MTV channels
Companies based in Taipei